A Little Princess is a 1997 Russian family drama film directed by Vladimir Grammatikov. It is based on the novel A Little Princess by Frances Hodgson Burnett.

Synopsis
As the movie opens, thick fog engulfs a London cab that drives through the city carrying Captain Crewe and his young daughter, Sarah. Captain Crewe has just returned from India. Sarah is unlike other children; she always thinks about things that are unusual.

Sarah's mother died when she was a baby, and her father has been called away for service. Sarah is left to be raised in a boarding house for noble maidens run by Miss Minchin, a cruel, selfish, and heartless woman.

On Sarah's birthday, news arrives from India that her father, Captain Crewe, has died. With the loss of her father, her status at the boarding house drops dramatically. She had previously been the best student and lived in a luxury apartment, but now she is sent to reside in the attic. She is forced to be a lowly maid alongside Becky, who soon becomes her confidant.

Unbeknownst to Sarah, Mr. Carissford has just arrived in London from India. He was a close friend and colleague of Sarah's father when they worked together in the diamond business. Mr. Carissford and his servant, Ram Dass, painstakingly sweep London in search of Sarah.

When they finally find her, they rescue her from the boarding house and inform Sarah that she has inherited her father's riches. Now, as part owner of her Father's powerful diamond business, Sarah returns to her prior status as a lady of great wealth. Despite the unexpected reversal of fortune, her character remains sweet and familiar to those around her.

With the holiday season approaching, Sarah invites everyone to a Christmas party. Miss Minchin tries to dissuade her sister, Amelia, and her pupils from going but they do not listen. In the end, even Minchin's favorite dog, tired of Miss Minchin's evil nature, runs off to the celebration.

Cast
 Anastasia Meskova as Sara Crewe
 Alla Demidova as Miss Maria Minchin
 Igor Yasulovich as Carrisford, Captain Crewe's business partner
 Yegor Grammatikov as Captain Crewe, Sarah's father. 
 Anna Terekhova as Miss Amelia Minchin, Maria Minchin's younger sister.
 Lyanka Gryu as Becky, Sara's best friend
 Tatyana Aksyuta as Miss Brown, bakerwoman
 Yekaterina Mikhaylovskaya as Ermengarde
 Sofia Timchenko as Lottie Legh
 Masha Mashkova as Lavinia Herbert
 Olesya Tretyakova as Annie, miss Brown's assistant
 Anna Dyakina as Jesse
 Victor Yanykov as Barrow, lawyer
 Ekaterina Morozova as Mariette, teacher
 Stepan Demeter as Ram Dass, Indian assistant of Mr. Carrisford
 Vladimir Grammatikov as an antiquarian
 Alexey Batalov as narrator (voice)

Awards and nominations

Awards 
 XVII Moscow International Film Festival for Children - Grand Gold Medal (Anastasia Meskova)
 Nika Award - Best Cinematographer (Aleksandr Antipenko)

Nominations 
 Nika Award - Best Actress (Alla Demidova), Best Production Designer (Konstantin Zagorsky), Best Costume Designer (Regina Khomskaya)
 Kinotavr - Grand Prize

References

External links
 
  A Little Princess on KinoPoisk

1997 films
1990s children's drama films
Russian children's drama films
Remakes of American films
Films about children
Films about educators
Films based on A Little Princess
Films set in the 1910s
Films set in 1914
Magic realism films
Films set in India
Films set in the British Raj
Films set in England
Films set in London